Pinus abies is a taxonomic synonym that may refer to:

 Pinus abies  = Picea abies
 Pinus abies , nom. illeg. = Abies alba
 Pinus abies var. laxa Münchh. = Picea glauca

References